Tom Gilmore is a downtown Los Angeles-based developer of residential and commercial properties. 

Gilmore began his career by building a small architectural firm in New York and eventually relocated to Los Angeles, leading to his partnership with Jerri Perrone. In 1998, Gilmore and Perrone formed an independent development firm, Gilmore Associates, to embark upon the redevelopment of the Historic Core of Downtown Los Angeles.

Developments
Gilmore purchased four abandoned historic buildings: the Continental, the Hellman, the San Fernando, and the Farmers and Merchants National Bank—all of which are located in Downtown Los Angeles and collectively renamed by Gilmore and Perrone as the “Old Bank District.”  Gilmore was the first developer to utilize the newly minted Adaptive Reuse Ordinance of 1999, which enabled him to convert historic commercial buildings into mixed- use residences, ultimately catalyzing the widespread redevelopment and revival of Downtown.

Community Affiliations
Gilmore serves on several city and non-profit boards. He is currently Chair of Central City Association (CCA); Mayoral-Appointee Chairman of Sister Cities of Los Angeles (SCOLA); MEXLA Commission member; Executive Committee Board Member of Los Angeles Tourism and Convention Bureau; ArtCenter Board Trustee, and Member of the Board of Governors at the Natural History Museum of Los Angeles County. Gilmore previously served as Chairman of the Board of Trustees for the  Southern California Institute of Architecture (SCI-Arc), Board Member Los Angeles Parks Foundation City Commissioner for the Los Angeles Homeless Services Authority and was Chairman in his final year of service.

Awards
LA Conservancy - 2019 Chair’s Award for Redbird | Vibiana 
Central City Association - Treasure of Los Angeles Award 2010 
Los Angeles Downtown News - Project of the Decade Award 2009 
Woodbury University - Citizen of the Year Award 2008 
Los Angeles Business Journal - Adaptive Reuse Developer Award 2007
Young Presidents' Organization of Los Angeles - L.A.'s Downtown Renaissance Award 2007
Beverly Hills Greater Los Angeles Association of Realtors - Donald J. Trump Award 2006 
Los Angeles Business Journal – Real Estate Pioneer Award 2006
Los Angeles Downtown News – Downtowner of Distinction Award 2006
Jason71 Design Studio – Crime Fighter Award 2003
American Institute of Architects – City Rebuilder Award 2002 
Hollywood Arts Council – Preservation Arts Award 2002 
Pacific Design Center – Stars of Design Award 2002 
Los Angeles Conservancy – Preservationist Award 2002
Los Angeles Conservancy – Preservationist Award 2001
California Preservation Foundation – Preservationist of the Year Award 2001
Midnight Mission – Visions Award 2001
St. Vincent Medical Center – Cornette Award 2001

References

1953 births
Living people
American real estate businesspeople